Missa (stylized as MISSA) is the debut EP by Japanese heavy metal band Dir En Grey, released on July 25, 1997.

Multiple songs off of the EP were reworked in one way or another throughout the band's career. "Garden" (stylized as "GARDEN") was re-recorded for the band's first video release, released in late 1997.  was remade for the Six Ugly EP in 2002.  was remade in 2012 and included on that year's Rinkaku single.

Technically however, this was not the first time "Kiri to Mayu" was reworked. The song was originally called , but one day before the recording of Missa began, Kyo was asked to change the lyrics. Throughout 1997, the song was only performed with the lyrics of "Kiri to Mayu". When "Kaede" ~if trans...~ was released, it came with a music video for "Sangeki no Yoru" and from then on, Kyo began to perform the song with its originally intended lyrics instead. They intended to include it on Missa, but decided against it and released it on "Kaede" ~if trans...~ as well.

Track listing

Personnel
 Dir En Grey
Kyo – vocals, lyricist
Kaoru – guitar
Die – guitar
Toshiya – bass guitar
Shinya – drums
Kimisada Kato – Co-producer

References 

1997 EPs
Dir En Grey EPs
Japanese-language EPs